The Fort of Our Lady of the Incarnation is a small fortification in the civil parish of Carvoeiro, municipality of Lagoa, in Portuguese Algarve.

History

In 1670, construction began on the fortress of Carvoeiro (alternately Our Lady of the Incarnation) under the orders of the Algarvean Governor Nuno de Mendoça, Count of Vale dos Reis. It was completed during the tenure of his successor, the Count of Pontevel, Nuno da Cunha de Ataíde, in 1675.

The fortress was significantly damaged during the 1755 Lisbon earthquake, while the chapel was completely ruined: the image of the patron saint was the only salvageable artifact. The writings of Father Ignácio de Sousa Oliveira (April 1758) suggest that the chapel was "very old", indicating that its cupola was crowned by a high octagonal obelisk of stone and masonry, serving as a guide for navigation. Under Commadant António Silvestre C. Tavares Júdice the reconstruction of the fort began in 1796.

An 1821 report from first-lieutenant of the Army Corps of Engineers, Gregório António, suggested that the fort continued to be in a considerable state of damage, with only one 18-calibre cannon onsite. Even this military piece was dismembered and nonoperational. This report resulted in the 1825 repairs to the fort and chapel. Though the 18-calibre munition was still at the fort in 1832, the fort was little used: in 1840, it was finally removed and both fortress and chapel were then considered in a state of ruin.

After being deactivated in 1861, the site was adapted as a post of the Guarda Fiscal, in 1871.

The chapel was restored in 1942 by Captain Josino da Costa, resulting in new roofing.

In 1965, the outpost and chapel were repaired under parish priest Father António Martins de Oliveira: the name was increased, a new roof was installed, and the construction of a transversal annex. The original church bell was conserved, then transferred to the front of the main body.

Architecture

The fortress, whose remains only include the eastern wall and gate, in addition to the Hermitage of Nossa Senhora da Encarnação and historical dependencies of the Portuguese outpost of the Guarda Fiscal. The fort gate is surmounted by a stone lintel on which is written the date of construction.

It is not known when the shrine was built in the interior of an entrenched polygonal-plan fortification, built to protect the populace from frequent assaults and plundering by pirates.

The shrine is a depository for two images: of the patron saint (Our Lady of the Incarnation) dating to the 17th century; and the Crucifixion, attributed in the 19th century.

References
Notes

Sources
 

Nossa Senhora Encarnacao Lagoa
Buildings and structures in the Algarve
Buildings and structures in Lagoa, Algarve
Coastal fortifications in Portugal